Ice XI is the hydrogen-ordered form of Ih, the ordinary form of ice. Different phases of ice, from ice II to ice XVIII, have been created in the laboratory at different temperatures and pressures. The total internal energy of ice XI is about one sixth lower than ice Ih, so in principle it should naturally form when ice Ih is cooled to below 72 K. The low temperature required to achieve this transition is correlated with the relatively low energy difference between the two structures. Water molecules in ice Ih are surrounded by four semi-randomly directed hydrogen bonds. Such arrangements should change to the more ordered arrangement of hydrogen bonds found in ice XI at low temperatures, so long as localized proton hopping is sufficiently enabled; a process that becomes easier with increasing pressure. Correspondingly, ice XI is believed to have a triple point with hexagonal ice and gaseous water at (~72 K, ~0 Pa).

Properties

Ice XI has an orthorhombic structure with space group Cmc21 containing eight molecules per unit cell. Its lattice parameters are a=4.465(3) Å, b=7.859(4) Å, and c=7.292(2) Å at 5 K. There are actually 16 crystallographically inequivalent hydrogen-ordered configurations of ice with an orthorhombic structure of eight atoms per unit cell, but electronic structure calculations show Cmc21 to be the most stable. Another possible configuration, with space group Pna21 is also of interest, as it is an antiferroelectric crystal, which Davidson and Morokuma incorrectly suggested as the most stable structure in 1984.

In practice, ice XI is most easily prepared from a dilute (10 mM) KOH solution kept just below 72 K for about a week (for D2O a temperature just below 76 K will suffice). The hydroxide ions create defects in the hexagonal ice, allowing protons to jump more freely between the oxygen atoms (and so this structure of ice XI breaks the 'ice rules'). More specifically, each hydroxide ion creates a Bjerrum L defect and an ionized vertex. Both the defect and the ion can move throughout the lattice and 'assist' with proton reordering. The positive K+ ion may also play a role because it is found that KOH works better than other alkali hydroxides. The exact details of these ordering mechanisms are still poorly understood and under question because experimentally the mobility of the hydroxide and K+ ions appear to be very low around 72 K. The current belief is that KOH acts only to assist with the hydrogen reordering and is not required for the lower-energy stability of ice XI. However, calculations by Toshiaki Iitaka in 2010 call this into question. Iitaka argues that the KOH ions compensate for the large net electric dipole moment of the crystal lattice along the c-axis. The aforementioned electronic structure calculations are done assuming an infinite lattice and ignore the effects of macroscopic electric fields created by surface charges. Because such fields are present in any finite size crystal, in non-doped ice XI, domains of alternating dipole moment should form as in conventional ferroelectrics. It has also been suggested that the ice Ih => ice XI transition is enabled by the tunneling of protons.

Although ice XI is thought to be a more stable conformation than ice Ih, the transformation is very slow. According to one report, in Antarctic conditions it is estimated to take at least 100,000 years to form without the assistance of catalysts. Ice XI was sought and found in Antarctic ice that was about 100 years old in 1998. A further study in 2004 was not able to reproduce this finding, however, after studying Antarctic ice which was around 3000 years old. Ice XI was also found in experiments using pure water at very low temperature (~10 K) and low pressure – conditions thought to be present in the upper atmosphere. Recently, small domains of ice XI were found to form in pure water; its phase transition back to ice Ih occurred at 72 K while under hydrostatic pressure conditions of up to 70 MPa.

Ice Ih that has been transformed to ice XI and then back to ice Ih, on raising the temperature, retains some hydrogen-ordered domains and more easily transforms back to ice XI again. A neutron powder diffraction study found that small hydrogen-ordered domains can exist up to 111 K.

There are distinct differences in the Raman spectra between ices  Ih and XI, with ice XI showing much stronger peaks in the translational (~230 cm−1), librational (~630 cm−1) and in-phase asymmetric stretch (~3200 cm−1) regions.

Ice Ic also has a proton-ordered form. The total internal energy of ice XIc was predicted as similar as ice XIh

History
Hints of hydrogen-ordering in ice had been observed as early as 1964, when Dengel et al. attributed a peak in thermo-stimulated depolarization (TSD) current to the existence of a proton-ordered ferroelectric phase. However, they could not conclusively prove that a phase transition had taken place, and Onsager pointed out that the peak could also arise from the movement of defects and lattice imperfections. Onsager suggested that experimentalists look for a dramatic change in heat capacity by performing a careful calorimetric experiment. A phase transition to ice XI was first identified experimentally in 1972 by Shuji Kawada and others.

Ferroelectric properties

Ice XI is ferroelectric, meaning that it has an intrinsic polarization. To qualify as a ferroelectric it must also exhibit polarization switching under an electric field, which has not been conclusively demonstrated but which is implicitly assumed to be possible. Cubic ice also has a ferrolectric phase and in this case the ferroelectric properties of the ice have been experimentally demonstrated on monolayer thin films. In a similar experiment, ferroelectric layers of hexagonal ice were grown on a platinum (111) surface. The material had a polarization that had a decay length of 30 monolayers suggesting that thin layers of ice XI can be grown on substrates at low temperature without the use of dopants.  One-dimensional nano-confined ferroelectric ice XI was created in 2010.

Astrophysical implications
As was mentioned, ice XI can theoretically form at low pressures at temperatures between 50–70 K – temperatures present in astrophysical environments of the outer solar system and within permanently shaded polar craters on the Moon and Mercury. Ice XI forms most easily around 70 K – paradoxically, it takes longer to form at lower temperatures. Extrapolating from experimental measurements, it is estimated to take ~50 years to form at 70 K and ~300 million years at 50 K. It is theorized to be present in places like the upper atmospheres of Uranus and Neptune and on Pluto and Charon.

Small domains of ice XI could exist in the atmospheres of Jupiter and Saturn as well.  The fact that small domains of ice XI can exist at temperatures up to 111 K has some scientists speculating that it may be fairly common in interstellar space, with small 'nucleation seeds' spreading through space and converting regular ice, much like the fabled ice-nine mentioned in Vonnegut's Cat's Cradle. The possible roles of ice XI in interstellar space and planet formation have been the subject of several research papers. Until observational confirmation of ice XI in outer space is made, the presence of ice XI in space remains controversial owing to the aforementioned criticism raised by Iitaka. The infrared absorption spectra of ice XI was studied in 2009 in preparation for searches for ice XI in space. Also, Pluto's outermost moon, Hydra, was recently discovered to have ice XI on the surface by New Horizons space probe during its July 14, 2015 flyby of the Pluto system.

References

External links

Water ice
Ferroelectric materials